The Hingley Baronetcy, of Cradley in the Parish of Halesowen in the County of Worcester, was a title in the Baronetage of the United Kingdom. It was created on 8 August 1893 for the ironmaster and Liberal politician Benjamin Hingley, with remainder in default of male issue of his own to the male issue of his late brother Hezekiah Hingley. He was succeeded according to the special remainder by his nephew, the second Baronet. On the latter's death in 1918 the title became extinct.

Hingley baronets, of Hatherton Lodge (1893)
 Sir Benjamin Hingley, 1st Baronet (1830–1905)
 Sir George Benjamin Hingley, 2nd Baronet (1850–1918)

References
 

Extinct baronetcies in the Baronetage of the United Kingdom
Baronetcies created with special remainders